Bely Kamen (Aq Taş) is a rural locality (a village) in Krasnoulsky Selsoviet, Gafuriysky District, Bashkortostan, Russia. The population was 118 as of 2010. There are 4 streets.

Geography 
Kurorta is the nearest rural locality.

References 

Rural localities in Gafuriysky District